The 69th edition of the KNVB Cup started on October 11, 1986. The final was played on June 5, 1987: Ajax beat FC Den Haag 4–2 and won the cup for the eleventh time.

Teams
 All 18 participants of the Eredivisie 1986-87
 All 19 participants of the Eerste Divisie 1986-87
 26 teams from lower (amateur) leagues
 One youth team

First round
The matches of the first round were played on October 11 and 12, 1986.

E Eredivisie; 1 Eerste Divisie; A Amateur teams

Second round
The matches of the second round were played on November 15 and 16, 1986.

Round of 16
The matches of the round of 16 were played on March 10 and 11, 1987.

Quarter finals
The quarter finals were played between March 29 and April 1, 1987. Instead of extra time, a replay was played if necessary.

Replay
The replay was played on April 15, 1987.

Semi-finals
The semi-finals were played on May 5, 1987. Instead of extra time, a replay was played if necessary.

Replay
The replay was played on May 19, 1987.

Final

Ajax had won the Cup Winners' Cup tournament this year, therefore the Netherlands were allowed to send two teams to next year's edition of 1987–88. This way, finalists FC Den Haag also qualified.

See also
Eredivisie 1986-87
Eerste Divisie 1986-87

External links
 Netherlands Cup Full Results 1970–1994 by the RSSSF

1986-87
1986–87 domestic association football cups
KNVB